"The Riverboat Song" is a song by British band Ocean Colour Scene. It is heavily influenced by Led Zeppelin's "Four Sticks", from which it takes its main riff and a number of lyrics. The song is written in  swing time.

The single was popularised by Radio 1 DJ Chris Evans, who played it frequently on his radio shows and to introduce guests on his television programme TFI Friday. As a result, having been released in February 1996, it reached number 15 on the UK Singles Chart, paving the way for the success of the next two singles, "You've Got It Bad" and "The Day We Caught the Train", as well as their album Moseley Shoals. It also became a moderate hit in New Zealand, where it peaked at number 37.

Track listings

UK CD single
 "The Riverboat Song"
 "So Sad"
 "Charlie Brown Says"

UK 7-inch and cassette single
 "The Riverboat Song"
 "So Sad"

Credits and personnel
Credits are taken from the Moseley Shoals album booklet.

Studio
 Recorded and mixed at Moseley Shoals (Birmingham, England)
 Mastered at the Powerplant (London, England)

Personnel

 Ocean Colour Scene – writing, production
 Simon Fowler – vocals, acoustic guitar
 Steve Cradock – guitar, piano, vocals
 Oscar Harrison – drums, piano, vocals
 Damon Minchella – bass guitar
 Paul Weller – organ
 Brendan Lynch – production
 Martin Heyes – engineering
 Tony Keach – assistant engineering
 Tim Young – mastering

Charts

Certifications

References

External links
 OCS Single Details
 

Ocean Colour Scene songs
1996 singles
1996 songs
MCA Records singles
Song recordings produced by Brendan Lynch (music producer)
Songs written by Damon Minchella
Songs written by Oscar Harrison
Songs written by Simon Fowler
Songs written by Steve Cradock